Jaime Murrell (October 1949 – 4 February 2021) was a Panamanian Christian music composer.

Career
Murrell was born in Panama City, and was a secular music national talent in the 1970s. He sang leads for a group by the name of "The Mozambiques" in Panama City. 

He died from COVID-19 in Miami at age 71 during the COVID-19 pandemic in Florida.

Discography
Grandes Son Tus Maravillas (with Marcos Witt) (1993)
Cristo Reina (1994)
Eres Señor (1996)
Te pido la Paz (1994)
Déjame que te alabe (1997)
Quiero alabar (1998)
Prometo Amarte (2000)
25 años de ministerio (2003)
Al que venció (2008)

References

External links
 
 

1949 births
2021 deaths
Panamanian composers
Panamanian male musicians
Male composers
Panamanian Christians
Deaths from the COVID-19 pandemic in Florida
People from Panama City
20th-century Panamanian musicians
20th-century composers
21st-century Panamanian musicians
21st-century composers
20th-century male musicians
21st-century male musicians